Cable Axion is a cable television distributor and Internet service provider based at Magog, Quebec.

Areas of operation
Estrie
 Austin
 Barnston
 Brome
 Brome Lake 
 Bonsecours
 Bromptonville 
 Chartierville
 Compton
 Cookshire-Eaton
 Dixville
 East Hereford
 Eastman
 Fitch Bay
 Georgeville 
 Gould
 Island Brook
 Lac Lovering
 La Patrie
 Lawrenceville
 Lingwick
 Magog
 Mansonville 
 Martinville
 Notre-Dame-des-Bois 
 Racine
 Saint-Camille 
 Saint-Adrien-de-Ham 
 Sainte-Anne-de-la-Rochelle 
 Saint-Denis-de-Brompton 
 Sainte-Edwidge
 Saint-Étienne-de-Bolton 
 Saint-François-Xavier
 Saint-Georges-de-Windsor
 Saint-Herménégilde
 Saint-Isidore-de-Clifton
 Saint-Malo
 Sainte-Marguerite-de-Lingwick
 Saint-Venant-de-Paquette
 Sawyerville
 Scotstown
 Stanhope
 Stanstead Township 
 Stukely
 Val-Joli
 Montérégie
 Bedford
 Frelighsburg
 Lacolle
 Napierville
 Saint-Mathieu
 Saint-Michel
 Saint-Paul-de-l'Île-aux-Noix 
 Stanbridge-Est
 Sutton
Beauce
 Sainte-Marie
 Saint-Joseph-de-Beauce
 Saint-Joseph-des-Érables
 Saints-Anges
 Saint-Odilon-de-Cranbourne
 Saint-Elzéar
 Saint-Bernard
 Saint-Jules
 Saint-Côme–Linière
 Vallée-Jonction
 Frampton
Bellechasse
 Saint-Malachie
 Saint-Nazaire
 Les Etchemins
 Saint-Léon-de-Standon
Lotbinière
 Saint-Patrice-de-Beaurivage
 Saint-Sylvestre
 Saint-Narcisse
 Lyster
 Laurierville
Mégantic
 Audet
 Frontenac
 Lac-Drolet
 Lac-Mégantic
 Marston
 Milan
 Nantes
 Piopolis
 Saint-Sébastien
 Sainte-Cécile-de-Whitton
 Woburn

External links
 Cable Axion

Cable and DBS companies of Canada
Internet service providers of Canada
Magog, Quebec